Don Yaeger is an American author and public speaker. He is an NSA-Certified Speaking Professional and eSpeakers-Certified Virtual Speaker. He has authored and co-authored 30 books, including 11 New York Times best-sellers.

Yaeger graduated from Ball State University in 1984. He worked as a reporter for the San Antonio Light from 1984–1985, as a reporter and Capitol Bureau Chief for the Dallas Morning News from 1986–1990, and as writer and Associate Editor for Sports Illustrated from 1996–2008.

Writing

Yaeger co-authored the autobiography of Pro-Football Hall of Fame Chicago Bears running back Walter Payton, Never Die Easy.  He has co-authored with other notable sports figures such as former UCLA head basketball coach John Wooden, MLB Chicago Cubs Manager David Ross, former NFL Baltimore Ravens offensive tackle Michael Oher, and Masters Tournament champion Bubba Watson.

Yaeger co-authored, with former Duke University lacrosse head coach Mike Pressler, It's Not About The Truth: The Untold Story of the Duke Lacrosse Case and the Lives it Shattered, which accounts for events during the 2006 Duke lacrosse case.

Yaeger co-authored, with Brian Kilmeade of Fox News, George Washington's Secret Six: The Spy Ring That Saved the American Revolution, Thomas Jefferson and the Tripoli Pirates: The Forgotten War That Changed American History, and Andrew Jackson and the Miracle of New Orleans: The Battle That Shaped America's Destiny.

Publications

 Under the Tarnished Dome: How Notre Dame Betrayed its Ideals for Football Glory (Simon & Schuster, 1993, with Douglas S Looney) 
 Never Die Easy: The Autobiography of Walter Payton (Villard, 2000, with Walter Payton) 
 Ya Gotta Believe: My Roller-Coaster Life As a Screwball Pitcher and Part-Time Father, and My Hope Filled Fight Against Brain Cancer (New American Library, 2004, with Tug McGraw) 
 It's Not About the Truth: The Untold Story of the Duke Lacrosse Scandal and the Lives it Shattered (2007) 
 I Beat the Odds: From Homelessness, to the Blind Side, and Beyond (Gotham Books, 2011, with Michael Oher) 
 Play it Like You Mean it: Passion, Laughs, and Leadership in the World's Most Beautiful Game (Don Yaeger with Rex Ryan, 2011)
 Nothing to Lose, Everything to Gain: How I Went From Gang Member to Multimillionaire Entrepreneur (Portfolio/Penguin, 2011, with Ryan Blair)
 George Washington's Secret Six: The Spy Ring That Saved the American Revolution (Sentinel, 2013, Don Yaeger with Brian Kilmeade) 
 Thomas Jefferson and the Tripoli Pirates: The Forgotten War That Changed American History (Sentinel, 2015, Don Yaeger with Brian Kilmeade) 
Tarnished Heisman: Did Reggie Bush Turn His Final College Season into a Six-Figure Job? (2008)
Great Teams: 16 Things High Performing Organizations Do Differently 
Greatness : The 16 Characteristics of True Champions
1% Better 
Best Seat in the House: 18 Golden Lessons from a Father to His Son 
You Are Worth It: Building a Life Worth Fighting For (Don Yaeger with Kyle Carpenter, 2019)

Personal life

Don Yaeger resides in Tallahassee, Florida with his wife and only child, Will.

References

Year of birth missing (living people)
Place of birth missing (living people)
Living people
American sports journalists
Ball State University alumni
American political journalists
20th-century American non-fiction writers
21st-century American non-fiction writers
20th-century American male writers
American male non-fiction writers
21st-century American male writers